East Chicago is a train station at 5615 Indianapolis Boulevard in East Chicago, Indiana. It serves the South Shore Line commuter rail line from Chicago, Illinois to South Bend, Indiana.

History
The station was built in 1956 as part of a South Shore Line project that removed a street running section on Chicago Avenue and placed the line on an elevated roadbed parallel to the Indiana Toll Road in order to improve speed and mitigate traffic issues. Prior to that, South Shore Line trains stopped in downtown East Chicago. In 2004 the station was remodeled with high level platforms to assist passengers with disabilities, and to decrease station dwell times.

Facilities
East Chicago consists of a single high-level island platform situated between two gauntlet tracks which permit the passage of freight trains. The northern track provides service to Chicago while the southern track services Michigan City and South Bend. At this location the South Shore Line is situated on an embankment and the platform traverses Indianapolis Boulevard. The station building is located east of Indianapolis Boulevard at ground level. The station is equipped with ticket vending machines; staffed service ended in 2017. Adjacent to the station is a parking lot with capacity for 1,200 cars.

NICTD approved a $4.4 million construction project in March 2019 to increase passenger access at East Chicago.

Bus connections
East Chicago Transit
 Route 1
 Route 2 
 Route 4

'''GPTC
 Route Route R1: Lakeshore Connection

References

External links
 
 South Shore Line - Stations

South Shore Line stations in Indiana
Railway stations in Lake County, Indiana
Railway stations in the United States opened in 1956
East Chicago, Indiana
1956 establishments in Indiana